The Port Cygnet Conservation Area is located in Cygnet, Tasmania, approximately  southwest of the state's capital city, Hobart. It is an open estuary environment including a listed wetland of state significance, being the only Marine Protected Area (MPA) in the Bruny Bioregion representing the Open Estuaries Biounit.

Port Cygnet was first proclaimed as a wildlife sanctuary in 1952 for the protection of the foreshore and wetlands. The marine component of the reserve area was proclaimed Port Cygnet Marine Conservation Area under the Nature Conservation Act 2002 on 9 December 2009.

The reserve is significant as a refuge area for numerous bird species including migratory birds such as Latham's snipe (Gallinago hardwickii), the Great egret (Egretta alba) and the Greater crested tern (Sterna bergii).

The wetland harbours species such as the Pied oystercatcher (Haematopus longirostris) and White-bellied sea eagle (Haliaeetus leucogaster)

See also
Protected areas of Tasmania

References

External links
Official webpage
Webpage on the Protected Planet website

Conservation areas of Tasmania